Mahindra Major was a renamed update of the Jeep CJ3B, developed by Mahindra and Mahindra. It was first marketed in 2004. It has the altered "New Generation Chassis," which was a 115 x 60 mm steel box section rather than the 100 x 50 mm C-section used earlier. This chassis was first seen on the Armada beginning in January 1998 and gradually filtered into the rest of Mahindra's range. This vehicle popularly known as "jeep" in rural areas of India.

History
In India, Mahindra acquired the licence to build Willys Jeeps back in 1947 and began assembling the Willys CJ3B. In a sense, since then Mahindra has not stopped making the Jeep. The latest iteration of the Jeep is the Mahindra Thar, whose body style is based on Jeep CJ5. That’s nearly 68 years of making Jeeps. Initially the CJ3A and Willys MB were also assembled in India by Mahindra, but continued to be branded as Willys.

Mahindra CJ 500/CL 500 (1975-1996)

The CJ 500D of 1975 was the first Mahindra Jeeps to be factory fitted with a Diesel engine. The MD2350 Diesel Engine with 3-speed gearbox had 38 hp, rather than the 72 hp of the Hurricane Petrol Engine. This pushed Mahindra to look for better & more powerful engine options. In spite of the lack of power, the CJ500D became one of the most wanted utility vehicle and the rural workhorse of India for the next 35 years, and finally ended up as the Mahindra Major. The MD2450, 2.5 liter diesel engine with 3-speed T90 Warner gearbox appeared in the CJ 500DE in 1989, replacing the earlier model. This version still has  at 2,300 rpm. It has a Spicer T18 2-speed Transfer Case.

In 1991 the engine was updated to the direct injected  MD2500 in the model named CJ 500DI. This was renamed CL 500 DI in 1994 after the end of the agreement with the Chrysler Corporation in 1994); CL stands for Civilian Legend.

Mahindra CJ-500 DI / CL-500 DI 
1991 - 1996
 
Specifications
Mahindra MDI2500, 2.5ltr diesel engine.
Popularly known as DI (Direct Injection) Engine, the most fuel efficient engine.
2522cc, 4 cylinder, Direct Injection
Power: 40hp @ 2300rpm
Torque: 14kg-m @ 1400rpm
3-speed manual gearbox, (Warner T90)
2-speed Transfer case (4wd), (Spicer T-18)

Mahindra CJ-500 DE
1989 - 1991
Specifications:
Mahindra MD2450, 2.5ltr diesel engine.

2522cc, 4 cylinder, Direct Injection
Power: 38hp @ 2300rpm
Torque: 13kg-m @ 1200rpm
3-speed manual gearbox, (Warner T90)
2-speed Transfer case (4wd), (Spicer T-18)
The upgraded MD2450 diesel engine was fitted on this vehicle to meet the emission regulations which came in to effect from 1989.

Mahindra CJ-500 D
1975 - 1989
Specifications:
CJ 500D was the first vehicle with a Diesel engine in the Mahindra Jeeps range.
 Mahindra's tractor division was manufacturing International Harvester B275 tractors. These tractors were fitted with BD-144 diesel engines. This engine is adopted for utility vehicles. Initially the BD-144 diesel engine were fitted in Mahindra CJ4A jeeps and introduced as Mahindra CJ 500D. This engine is popularly known as international engine, which is used in Mahindra tractors.
 MD2350 diesel engine, 2350cc
 Power: 38hp @ 2300rpm
 Torque: 13kg-m @ 1200rpm

Mahindra CL-550 MDI (1996-2005) 

Major
Major was an upgrade to the CL550 MDI vehicle with the upgraded MDI3200 Diesel engine.
 A more powerful & fuel efficient MDI (Super) 3200 engine, with quick starting response and lower oil consumption, as opposed to the F134 engine of the CJ3B, though the F134 was quieter.
 The Major was fitted with –
 MDI3200 TC, 2.5 liter Diesel engine
  NGT 520, 5-speed gearbox
 T18, Spicer, 2-speed transferbox (4WD) 
  48.4 wheel track
 The major has recirculating ball type steering. 
 A new inline fuel injection system for higher fuel average and lower maintenance, later a rotary type pump was used.
 Modified rear axle ratio and OEY axle lower maintenance costs.
 New vinyl seats, new steering wheel, new front apron cover, new superstructure and new canopy.
 Radial tyres for longer life, better ride and handling.
 It was made using tooling from the discontinued Mitsubishi Jeeps, and distinctive from the CJ3B based Mahindra vehicles in the following ways:
 The firewall was away from the passenger compartment
 The driver seat was lower
 The foot rests were made from pipe rather than a single stamping.
 The canvas hood side windows had a different design.
 The engines were modified International Harvester diesels, 3.5 inch bore X 4 inch stroke, with direct injection, turbocharging and a 'steel' head which did not corrode so easily as the older cast iron type. 3200 refers to the RPM, output was about 63 HP.
 The picture is of a Mahindra MM550, earlier called CJ 540, and MM540 (CJ was dropped when they separated from Jeep license), engines were 62 HP Peugeot 4.88, later 74 HP Peugeot 4.90 diesels, and rarely Isuzu 1800 cc petrol sourced locally from Hindustan Motors. Vehicles sold to Iran had Mitsubishi petrol engines, and most had the Dana Spicer 5-speed gearbox, made under license by Mahindra Spicer, part of the Mahindra group. The 540 had a KIA designed 4 speed gearbox.

The Major replaced the CJ500D/CL550 models and was placed below the posher Mahindra Thar.

Production ceased on 1 October 2010, and was reported as the last flat fender jeep to go out of production in the world.

References

Major
Cars introduced in 2004